A by-election was held for the New South Wales Legislative Assembly electorate of Gwydir on 10 June 1886 because of the resignation of William Campbell.

Dates

Result

William Campbell resigned.

See also
Electoral results for the district of Gwydir
List of New South Wales state by-elections

References

1886 elections in Australia
New South Wales state by-elections
1880s in New South Wales